Moores Valley is an unincorporated community in Marengo County, Alabama, United States.

History
Moores Valley was founded when the Frisco Railroad was extended to that point.

Geography

References

Unincorporated communities in Alabama
Unincorporated communities in Marengo County, Alabama